Alfons Migau (born 2 December 1998) is an Indonesian professional footballer who plays as a winger for Liga 1 club Persipura Jayapura.

Club career

Persipura Jayapura
He was signed for Persipura Jayapura to play in Liga 1 in 2022. Alfons made his professional debut on 6 January 2022 in a match against Persela Lamongan at the Kapten I Wayan Dipta Stadium, Gianyar.

Career statistics

Club

Notes

Honours

Club
Persipura U-19
 Liga 1 U-19: 2017

References

External links
 Alfons Migau at Soccerway
 Alfons Migau at Liga Indonesia

1998 births
Living people
Indonesian footballers
Persipura Jayapura players
Liga 1 (Indonesia) players
Association football wingers
Sportspeople from Papua